The Angel phase describes a 300–400-year cultural manifestation of the Mississippian culture of the central portions of the United States of America, as defined in the discipline of archaeology.  Angel phase archaeological sites date from c. 1050 - 1350 CE and are located on the northern and southern sides of the Ohio River in southern Indiana, such as National Historic Landmark Angel Mounds near present-day Evansville; northwestern Kentucky, with Wickliffe Mounds and the Tolu Site; and Kincaid Mounds State Historic Site in Illinois.  Additional sites range from the mouth of Anderson River in Perry County, Indiana, west to the mouth of the Wabash in Posey County, Indiana.

Angel phase assemblage
One of the most extensive Mississippian artifact assemblages in its region, the Angel phase collection consists of well over 2.5 million individually catalogued objects.  The count is rising yearly with continued excavation and research.  Characteristic to Angel phase mounds in particular, the assemblage is overwhelmingly ceramic, with vessels and pottery fragments occupying just under 70% of the total count, or more than 1.8 million sherds. (Hilgeman, 2000:25).  Of this vast quantity, 98% are plain or decorated with relatively common designs.  The common decorations such as cord marking and fabric impressing are very rare.

Chipped-stone artifacts and debris are uncommon at Angel phase mounds, consisting of less than 1% of all artifacts.  Ground-stone artifacts are fewer, representing about one-seventh the frequency of their chipped counterparts.  Faunal remains are, however, a significant portion of the assemblage, with specimen counts attributing about 20%.

From a regional perspective, certain patterns and comparisons can be observed between other assemblages and among time periods.  First, the simplicity or plainness of the Angel collection is similar to comparable assemblages from the Tennessee-Cumberland region.  It is considered more plain than other Ohio-Mississippi confluence assemblages.  Second, there is a trend toward greater plainness as time progresses.  From early Angel 2 phase to late Angel 3 phase, the percentage of decorated sherds relative to all sherds declined from 3% to 0.6%.  This trend is in line with regional trends in Tennessee-Cumberland and Western Kentucky assemblages that deemphasized painting as a mode of decoration from prior to 1200 CE compared to afterward.

Styles

Artifact seriation
The chronology of Angel pottery is based upon certain markers that occur in the assemblage.  These markers are chosen because they either appear to follow a continuous change over time, which allows classification by seriation, or they are absent/present in a stratigraphic-level base at the time of maximum usage.  Rim thickness and handle variation are markers that gradually shift in pottery styles over time.  They can be associated with the general early period, with the loop handle shifting toward the strap handle later. The appearance of a Ramey Incised sherd demarcates an earlier period, and the appearance of a Parkin Punctuated sherd indicates a later period.

The context in which these artifact markers are found contributes to whether the chronology can be deemed viable and acceptable as a temporal scale.  To ensure that this is true, a series of eliminations of questionable layers is conducted to create a sample that represents undisturbed archaeological stratigraphy.

Spatiotemporal distribution

In the lower Ohio River valley in Illinois, Kentucky, and Indiana, the Mississippian-culture towns of Kincaid, Wickliffe, Tolu, and Angel Mounds have been grouped together into a "Kincaid focus" set, due to similarities in pottery assemblages and site plans.  Most striking are the comparisons between the Kincaid and Angel sites, which include analogous site plans, stylistic similarities in artifacts, and geographic proximity.  These connections have led some experts to hypothesize that the builders and residents were of the same society.

The 300-400 year span in which these types of artifacts and sites are found is called the "Angel phase".  It is broken up into three subphases: 
Jonathan Creek (1000/1100-1200CE),
Angelly (1200-1300CE), and
Tinsley Hill (1300-1450CE) (30).
All four mound sites (above) include painted and incised sherds that are very rare, ranging from less than one percent near Kincaid to about three or four percent of the assemblage at Wickliffe.  Some common pottery styles found in these sites include: Angel Negative Painted, Kincaid Negative Painted, and Matthews Incised (32). This pottery is shell tempered and ranges from the smoothed surface and coarser temper of Mississippi Ware to the more polished surface and finer temper of Bell Ware (31).

Regional manifestations

Chronology
Many of the structures in the site were built in the early Angel 2 phase (1200 to 1325).  According to the stratigraphy of midden deposits, this was the earliest Middle Mississippian occupation of Angel.  During this phase at Angel, pottery design indicates that this was the same time period as when Middle Wickliffe transitioned to Late Wickliffe phase, as well as Angelly.

The proposed Angel 1 phase (Stephan–Steinkamp phase, 1100 to 1200?), is represented only by pottery sherds in the vicinity of, but not in, the Angel Mounds site.  Mound A was constructed in the early 13th century, during the Angel 2 phase.  The pottery found at the top of the mound dates to only Angel 2.  This suggests that the mound was no longer in use for Angel 3 (1325 to 1450).

Kincaid's largest platform mound, which is similar to Angel Mound A (MX10), was also used only until about 1300.

According to pottery deposits throughout the Angel site, only half the area was occupied for Angel 2.  The dating of human remains buried at the site and Angel 3 pottery suggest that the majority of the site (north, west, east, and interior areas) was in use during Angel 3.  There appeared to be more activity and a more populous occupation during Angel 3 than during Angel 2.

Archaeologists theorize that by 1450 CE with the collapse of the Angel chiefdom, many of the Angel people had relocated downriver to the confluence of the Ohio and Wabash rivers. A new Late Mississippian cultural group subsequently emerged and are known as the Caborn-Welborn culture.

History of research
The history of research concerning Angel phase and Mississippian archaeology is chiefly focused on the study of shell-tempered pottery.  The first accounts of the process of shell-tempered pottery in the Southeast were described by Dumont. In his historical account, Dumont described how women were in charge of the process.  He described in rich detail the skill and elements involved in the creation of shell-tempered pottery.  Pottery of the region has been studied by archeologists both to define chronology of sites and to understand cultural relationships.  Fay-Cooper Cole, et al. (1951:229) grouped the lower Ohio Valley Mississippian towns of Angel, Kincaid, Tolu and Wickliffe into the "Kincaid focus".  The geographic distribution of Angel and Caborn-Welborn settlements, their classifications, and their relationships with each other were examined by Thomas J. Green and Cheryl Ann Munson in a series of publications; the key Angel phase sites in their work were Angel and Ellerbusch, a small site near Angel.

Radiocarbon dating was used together with analysis of regional trends of assemblages to fill in aspects of the temporal range of the Angel Mounds site.  As the discipline of archaeology changed, the focus of research in Mississippian archaeology changed with it.  Chronology by seriation became an essential step towards answering more complex questions, instead of being only the final result of a study.  "The second major change in Mississippian studies is that pottery analysis is addressing new questions – compositional, technological, functional and stylistic…"  Compositional studies include: 
 the first thin-section analyses conducted by Porter;
 microscopic examination of paste and temper in order to identify non-local vessels and improve the classification of sherds; and
 more recent studies focused on resources and exchange patterns.

Breakthroughs in Mississippian archaeology technology studies include:
 detailed information on manufacture of pottery by Million and van der Leeuw;
 Stimmel's finding that sodium chloride improves the workability of shell-tempered clay; and
 studies conducted by Steponaitis, Bronitsky and Hamer to assess the resistance of fine shell-tempered versus coarse shell-tempered pottery to thermal and mechanical stresses.

Functional studies include:
 the difference between ceremonial pottery and utilitarian pottery by Sears and Childress;
 "Smith noted that a number of innovations in pottery technology are associated with the cultivation, storage, processing and preparation of maize."
 Hally's use of vessel morphology and surface to describe how the vessel's function was altered.

Stylistic advances in Mississippian pottery related to the Southwestern Ceremonial Complex group defined by Waring and Holder.  Mississippian pottery, especially from Angel and Kincaid, has been grouped with Southeastern pottery because they shared the same motifs.

References

 Hilgeman, Sherri L. Pottery and Chronology at Angel, Tuscaloosa: University of Alabama Press, 2000.

Middle Mississippian culture
Archaeological sites in Illinois
Archaeological sites in Indiana
Archaeological sites in Kentucky